Philip Gaughan (March 17, 1865 – December 31, 1913) was a sergeant(Originally an infantry worker) serving in the United States Marine Corps during the Spanish–American War who received the Medal of Honor for bravery.

Biography
Gaughan was born on March 17, 1865, in Belmullet, County Mayo, Ireland. He joined the Marine Corps from Philadelphia in July 1887.

Gaughan died on December 31, 1913, while still in active service, and is buried at Holy Cross Cemetery in Yeadon, Pennsylvania.

Medal of Honor citation
Rank and organization: Sergeant, U .S. Marine Corps. Born: 17 March 1865, Belmullet, Ireland. Accredited to: Pennsylvania. G.O. No.: 521, 7 July 1899.

See also

List of Medal of Honor recipients for the Spanish–American War

References

External links

1865 births
1913 deaths
19th-century Irish people
American military personnel of the Spanish–American War
Irish emigrants to the United States (before 1923)
Irish-born Medal of Honor recipients
Military personnel from County Mayo
People from New York (state)
Spanish–American War recipients of the Medal of Honor
United States Marine Corps Medal of Honor recipients
United States Marines